This is a list of notable buildings associated with the American Legion.

Many hundreds of buildings have an association with the American Legion. This list focuses only on those significant architecturally or otherwise. It includes those documented in the National Register of Historic Places or a similar registry. Names of buildings include "American Legion Hall", "American Legion Post", "Building", "Hut", and variations.  American Legion hall buildings are located throughout the United States, and perhaps in associated territories.

A number of NRHP-listed American Legion buildings were designed or built by the Civil Works Administration or the Works Progress Administration, two New Deal programs.

In the United States (ordered by state, then city)

References